Chéché or Ché Ché  is a village in the Gabú Region of north-eastern Guinea-Bissau. It lies on the south of the Corubal River, to the south of Canjadude.
The river crossing was the site of the Cheche Disaster of 6 February 1969, in which about 50 Portuguese soldiers drowned in an accident when their ferry tipped over.

References

Populated places in Guinea-Bissau
Gabu Region